Saka Tunggal Mosque (formally Saka Tunggal Baitussalam Mosque) is a mosque located in Cikakak, Banyumas, Central Java. Established in 1871, it is considered a Cultural Property of Indonesia. The complex is home to thousands of monkeys.

History
Saka Tunggal Mosque was established in 1871 CE, or 1288 hijri; the latter year is inscribed on the lone pillar in the mosque. The name of the mosque is derived from this column: saka tunggal translates as "lone pillar". The roof of the central room is made of palm tree fibers.

The mosque is held to have been established by Kyai Tulih (also spelled Ki Ageng Tolih), a pioneer of the Aboge school of Islam which combined the Islamic and Javanese calendars. The site remains sacred to followers of Aboge Islam,  Saka Tunggal Mosque is often used for Eid prayers by the Aboge in Banyumas.

In 2004 the mosque was designated a Cultural Property of Indonesia. It is open to tourists, but under-utilized and poorly managed. Little infrastructure has been developed to support the development of the mosque and its surrounding area as a tourist object. As such, in 2014 only 2,000 visitors were recorded.

Description

The site lacks public toilets or other facilities for tourists.

Near the mosque is a graveyard where Kyai Tulih is buried. This graveyard is surrounded by a  bamboo fence and divided into three parts: the upper, middle, and lower cemetery. Each part of the cemetery has its own juru kunci (caretaker).

Every year on the 26th day of Rajab, the bamboo fence (jaro in Javanese) surrounding the cemetery is replaced in a ceremony known as Jaro Rohab. Men replace the fence, beginning near the grave of Kyai Tulih then continuing on in the direction of the mosque. Meanwhile, women prepare food for a ritual known as slametan; the ceremony is done by the cemetery's three juru kunci. The Jaro Rojab ritual is intended to commemorate the Night Journey of the prophet Muhammad and to spiritually cleanse the participants. It attracts Muslims from much of Central and West Java, including representatives of the Surakarta Sunanate in Surakarta.

The area around the mosque is home to thousands of monkeys. These monkeys often come to the mosque area, though they are not supposed to be fed by tourists. The monkeys are considered sacred by the local residents, and thus may not be killed or injured. During the dry season they may attack residents' homes, stealing food or other objects.

See also
Mosques in Indonesia

References

Works cited

External links

Banyumas Regency
Mosques completed in 1871
Cultural Properties of Indonesia in Central Java
Mosques in Indonesia
Tourist attractions in Central Java